Alberto de Rossi (born 9 September 1957) is an Italian football manager and former player. Serving between 2003 and 2022, he is the longest lasting manager in the history of Roma's U19 side.

Career 

He made his senior debut at 16 for Ostia Mare, and after leaving A.S. Roma’s youth sector, he had a modest career in the lower leagues of Italian football, playing in Serie C, Serie C1, Serie C2 and Interregionale, before retiring in 1992.

From 1997 to 2003 he takes the role of manager for many sides of Roma's youth sector, before sitting on the bench of the Primavera side for what has been 18 years now. On 17 July 2021, he renewed his contract with A.S. Roma for another year extending his stay for a 19th season.

In June 2022, De Rossi finally left his position as Under-19 manager after 19 years in charge, and was subsequently appointed as the club's new head of youth coach development.

Personal life

He is the father of former Italian footballer Daniele de Rossi.

Honours

Player

Livorno

 Serie C2: 1983–1984

Manager

Roma Primavera

 Campionato Primavera 1: 2004–2005, 2010–2011, 2016–2017
 Coppa Italia Primavera: 2011–2012, 2016–2017
 Supercoppa Primavera: 2012, 2016

References

1957 births
Living people
A.S. Roma managers
A.S. Roma players
Footballers from Rome
Italian footballers
Association footballers not categorized by position